Nani Bhattacharya (1917-1993) was one of the founder-members of the Revolutionary Socialist Party, trade union activist, minister in West Bengal, and Member of Parliament.

Early days
Nani Bhattacharya was born to Kalidas Bhattacharya at Khagra, Murshidabad district, on 6 November 1917. He passed matriculation from Jiaganj School. He completed his higher education in spite of severe adversities. He studied at Arnakali Tole in Baharampur for sometime and completed his graduation from the University of Calcutta.

In early life, he was a member of Anushilan Samiti. In 1940, he played an important role in the founding of the Revolutionary Socialist Party.

For his participation in the national struggle, he was interned during 1936-38 and imprisoned during 1940–46. He was imprisoned on a number of occasions before and after independence.

Trade union activities and electoral politics
Apart from development of the trade union of the railway workers, he worked amongst the tea garden workers in the Dooars. He was associated with Dooars Cha Bagan Workers’ Union. In 1950, he was editor of the RSP mouth-piece, Ganavarta.

Nani Bhattaharya was elected to the West Bengal state assembly from Alipurduars (Vidhan Sabha constituency) in 1967, 1969, 1977, 1982, and 1987.

He was elected to the Lok Sabha from Baharampur (Lok Sabha constituency) in 1989 and 1991.

In 1967, 1969 and 1977-82 he was the health minister in West Bengal, and during 1982-87 he was irrigation minister in the state.

In 1989, he was state secretary of RSP.

Death
He died on 11 October 1993.

References

Revolutionary Socialist Party (India) politicians
1917 births
1993 deaths
Lok Sabha members from West Bengal
West Bengal MLAs 1962–1967
West Bengal MLAs 1967–1969
West Bengal MLAs 1977–1982
West Bengal MLAs 1982–1987
West Bengal MLAs 1987–1991
People from Murshidabad district
Bhattachrya, Nani
India MPs 1991–1996